Tanveer Aslam Malik is a Pakistani politician who had been a member of the Provincial Assembly of the Punjab from August 2018 till January 2023. Previously he was a member of the Punjab Assembly from 2002 to May 2018.

Early life and education
He was born on 10 June 1972 in Lahore.

He has a degree  of Bachelor of Commerce  which he obtained in 1992 from University of Karachi and has a degree of Master of Business Administration  in Marketing which he received in 1995 from Southeastern University.

Political career
He was elected to the Provincial Assembly of the Punjab as a candidate of Pakistan Muslim League (Q) (PML-Q) from Constituency PP-21 (Chakwal-II) in 2002 Pakistani general election. He received 35,698 votes and defeated Shaukat Hussain Shah, a candidate of Pakistan Muslim League (N) (PML-N).

He was re-elected to the Provincial Assembly of the Punjab as a candidate of PML-N from Constituency PP-21 (Chakwal-II) in 2008 Pakistani general election. He received 57,463 votes and defeated Shaukat Hussain Shah, a candidate of PML-Q.

He was re-elected to the Provincial Assembly of the Punjab as a candidate of PML-N from Constituency PP-21 (Chakwal-II) in 2013 Pakistani general election. In June 2013, he was inducted into the provincial cabinet of Chief Minister Shahbaz Sharif and was made Provincial Minister of Punjab for Housing, Urban Development and Public Health Engineering. He remained Minister for Housing, Urban Development and Public Health Engineering until November 2016. In a cabinet reshuffle in November 2016, he was appointed as Provincial Minister of Punjab for  Communication and Works.

He was re-elected to Provincial Assembly of the Punjab as a candidate of PML-N from Constituency PP-22 (Chakwal-II) in 2018 Pakistani general election.

References

Living people
Punjab MPAs 2013–2018
1972 births
Southeastern University (Washington, D.C.) alumni
University of Karachi alumni
Pakistan Muslim League (N) MPAs (Punjab)
Punjab MPAs 2002–2007
Punjab MPAs 2008–2013
Punjab MPAs 2018–2023